Lisa Raymond and Rennae Stubbs were the defending champions, but competed this year with different partners. Raymond teamed up with Lindsay Davenport and lost in the first round to Anna Kournikova and Chanda Rubin, while Stubbs teamed up with Conchita Martínez and lost in the final to tournament winners Kim Clijsters and Ai Sugiyama, 6–3, 6–3.

It was the 5th title for Clijsters and the 21st title for Sugiyama in their respective doubles careers.

Seeds

Draw

Draw

References
 Main and Qualifying Rounds

Women's Doubles
Doubles